Space Boogie: Smoke Oddessey is the third studio album by American rapper Kurupt, it is also his final album to be released through Antra Records. It is also his first solo album not to feature a Dr. Dre produced track. He soon signed back to Death Row Records as a solo artist.

Reception

Critical

Space Boogie: Smoke Oddessey received mixed to positive reviews from critics.

Commercial
The album debuted at number ten on the Billboard 200 in its first week of release.

Track listing

Notes
"At It Again" contains additional vocals from Fingazz.

Sample credits
"At It Again" contains samples of Just Got Paid", written by Gene Griffin and Johnny Kemp and performed by Johnny Kemp.

Charts

References

Kurupt albums
2001 albums
Albums produced by Daz Dillinger
Albums produced by DJ Quik
Albums produced by Fredwreck
Albums produced by Mike Dean (record producer)
Albums produced by Soopafly